John O'Callaghan may refer to:

 John O'Callaghan (Medal of Honor) (1850–1899), American soldier and Medal of Honor recipient
 John O'Callaghan (politician) (died 1913), secretary of the United Irish League
 John O'Callaghan (musician), Irish musician and DJ
 Liam McCarthy and John D. O'Callaghan, BT Young Scientists of the Year and EU Young Scientists of the Year, 2009
 John Cornelius O'Callaghan (1805–1883), Irish historian and writer
 John Joseph O'Callaghan (1838–1905), Irish architect
 John O'Callaghan (singer), vocalist and guitarist of The Maine
 John O'Callaghan (American football) (born 1964), American football player in the 1987 Seattle Seahawks season

See also
 John Callaghan (disambiguation)